Harry C. Knight (August 6, 1889 – July 4, 1913) was an American racecar driver.  He competed in the first two Indianapolis 500 races as well as two "pre-500 era" races at the Indianapolis Motor Speedway in 1910, finishing second in a 100-mile race. In the inaugural Indy 500, Knight heroically swerved out of the way to save another driver who had left the pits with a broken steering knuckle, and wrecked his car. Knight was regarded by some newspapers as the "Hero of Indianapolis" and it was said that had he not wrecked, he could have won the race. Knight suffered a severe brain concussion and bruises. The first words he cried were, “I didn’t hit him, I didn’t hit him!” according to eyewitnesses. Knight and his riding mechanic Milton Michaelis were killed while racing in a 200-mile Championship Car race at the Columbus Driving Park, a 1-mile dirt oval, in July 1913.

Indianapolis 500 results

References

External links

1889 births
1913 deaths
People from Grant County, Indiana
Racing drivers from Indiana
Indianapolis 500 drivers
Racing drivers who died while racing
Sports deaths in Ohio
Burials in Indiana